William Broderick Cloete (1851 – 7 May 1915) was a South African-born British industrialist active in the border zones between Mexico and the United States in the late 19th century. He and Robert Symon, an industrialist from Boston, purchased 1.3 million acres of land between Monterrey and Saltillo, which constituted the only workable railway route between Monterrey and the interior of Mexico. After the Mexican National Construction Company chose to plot the Mexican National Railroad across this land, Symon sold his stake for $60,000 to a group of British investors incorporated as the San Marcos and Pinos company, while Cloete - who gained an additional advantage from land ownership, since the railway would access several mines he owned - retained his stake, eventually becoming a director of the new company. On 18 July 1902 he married Violet Kate Henley, the daughter of Joseph Arthur Henley; they maintained a residence in Hare Park outside London.

Cloete is also noted for his belief in the legend of the Lost Nigger Gold Mine; he offered Lock Campbell, a Texan man, expenses of $10,000 if he would undertake an expedition to find it. On 19 July 1899, Campbell and four other men signed an agreement to search for it, and one of the men later claimed to have discovered it in the Ladrones Mountains in New Mexico, but this was never verified. He died in the Sinking of the RMS Lusitania on 7 May 1915, but his body was never identified.

References

Bibliography

External links
 

British industrialists
1915 deaths
Deaths on the RMS Lusitania
1851 births
Racehorse owners and breeders
South African expatriates in the United Kingdom
19th-century British businesspeople